The Best of INXS is a greatest hits album by Australian rock band INXS, released on 4 June 2002 by Atlantic Records and Rhino Entertainment. It featured digitally remastered versions of tracks from previous albums and reached #144 on the US charts, selling more than 373,000 copies since its release. The nearly identical counterpart compilation released in the same year, Definitive INXS, was a moderate chart success in the UK, peaking at #15.

Track listing
An alternative release of this LP re-organises the track listing.

Limited special edition disc
"Mystify" Live from America
"Suicide Blonde" Live from America
"New Sensation" Live from America
"Tight" Dan the Automator remix
"Precious Heart" Tall Paul vs. INXS – Radio edit
"I'm So Crazy" Par-T-One vs. INXS – Radio edit
"Suicide Blonde" Music video
"Need You Tonight" Music video
"Mystify" Music video

Personnel

INXS
Michael Hutchence – vocals, production
Andrew Farriss – keyboards, guitars, production
Tim Farriss – guitars, bass, production
Kirk Pengilly – guitar, saxophone, vocals, production
Garry Gary Beers – bass, production
Jon Farriss – drums, production

Additional musicians
Sunil DeSilva – percussion on "Not Enough Time"
Deni Hines – backing vocals on "Not Enough Time"
Casual – rap on "Tight"
James Morrison – brass section on "Tight"

References

2002 greatest hits albums
INXS compilation albums
Atlantic Records compilation albums
Rhino Records compilation albums